De Papegaai is the lesser of the two parochial churches in the St Nicholas Roman Catholic parish in Amsterdam.  The church is dedicated to Saints Peter and Paul. It is nicknamed "De Papegaai" (The Parrot) because it was originally hidden in a garden behind a regular housefront that belonged to a bird-trader in the days when Catholicism could not be practised publicly. Today there is a narrow, Neo-Gothic facade flanked by statues of St Joseph and a perched parrot. The church is on the busy Kalverstraat just south of Dam Square, and invites people in for quiet, as well as celebrating Sunday Mass (Post-Vatican II Mass) in Latin with Gregorian chant.

Services
Sunday:
1030 Sung Mass in Latin
1215 Sung Mass in Latin
Monday-Saturday
1030 Eucharist

External links 

 

P
Rijksmonuments in Amsterdam
Roman Catholic churches in the Netherlands